Dag Hol (born 26 October 1951, in Hamburg) is a Norwegian figurative painter and graphic artist. He is educated at the Norwegian National Academy of Fine Arts (1980-1984) and has been a student of Gunnar Dietrichson and Odd Nerdrum. Earlier he studied Nordic, French and German language and literature at the University of Oslo. He has since he was 18–19 years old practised yoga and Acem-meditation regularly and this has influenced his artistic and philosophical point of view. He made his debut as an artist with his solo exhibition in 1983 in Oslo.                                                               

His work is influenced by the old masters, from Renaissance art to Romanticism.

He has studied Indian, Chinese and Japanese classical art and philosophy as well. He has given several artphilosophical speeches in Norway, USA, India and Taiwan, some with the title "The Art of Doing". His main philosophy is the focusing on the craftmanship as a signature and essence of what art is all about. Its through the attitude and the way art is created which decide the spiritual energy and power in the artistic expression. He oppose to the modern view of art that the concept and the ideas in art is the most important and central. He means that the concept and the ideas emerge from the way the art is done.

At Dag Hols solo exhibition in The City Hall of Oslo in March 2012 more than 3000 people attained the opening and more than 21000 people came to the show during the three weeks the exhibition was open (according to the security department at the City Hall), which made the exhibition to one of the best visited solo exhibitions ever in Norwegian art history.

References

Links
Personal homepage: http://www.daghol.no 

OpenSea Zodiac NFT collection: https://opensea.io/collection/daghol-zodiac

1951 births
Living people
20th-century Norwegian painters
21st-century Norwegian painters
Norwegian male painters
Oslo National Academy of the Arts alumni
20th-century Norwegian male artists
21st-century Norwegian male artists
Students of Odd Nerdrum